The 2020 Trofeo de Campeones de la Liga Profesional (officially the Trofeo de Campeones Binance 2020 for sponsorship reasons) is the postponed first edition of the Trofeo de Campeones de la Liga Profesional, an annual football match contested by the winners of Primera División and Copa de la Liga Profesional competitions, similar to the defunct Trofeo de Campeones de la Superliga Argentina.

As Boca Juniors won both championships, 2019–20 Primera División and 2020 Copa LPF, River Plate and Banfield (runners-up of the aforementioned competitions) played a semifinal, on 22 February 2023, to define the rival of Boca Juniors. River Plate defeated Banfield by a 3–2 score.

The final will be played on TBD 2023, at Estadio Mario Alberto Kempes in Córdoba, between Boca Juniors and River Plate.

Qualified teams

Matches

Semifinal

Final

References 

t
t
t
t